I Wanna Be Around... is a 1963 album by singer Tony Bennett.

Track listing
"The Good Life" (Sacha Distel, Jack Reardon) – 2:15
"If I Love Again" (Jack Murray, Ben Oakland) – 3:19
"I Wanna Be Around" (Johnny Mercer, Sadie Vimmerstadt) – 2:11
"I've Got Your Number" (Cy Coleman, Carolyn Leigh) – 1:45
"Until I Met You" (Freddie Green, Don Wolf) – 2:57
"Let's Face the Music and Dance" (Irving Berlin) – 2:52 (omitted on CD reissue)
"Once Upon a Summertime" (Eddie Barclay, Michel Legrand, Eddy Marnay, Mercer) – 2:00
"If You Were Mine" (Matty Malneck, Mercer) – 2:15
"I Will Live My Life for You" (Henri Salvador, Marcel Stellman) – 2:26
"Someone to Love" (Harry Warren) – 1:58
"It Was Me" (Gilbert Becaud, Norman Gimbel) – 3:04
"Quiet Nights of Quiet Stars (Corcovado)" (Antônio Carlos Jobim, Gene Lees) – 3:16

Bonus tracks on CD reissue (all taken from the album "This Is All I Ask"):
"Autumn in Rome" (Sammy Cahn, Alessandro Cicognini, Paul Weston) – 2:15
"The Way That I Feel" (Harry Brooks) – 2:55
"The Moment of Truth" (Tex Satterwhite, Frank Scott) – 2:14
"Got Her Off My Hands (But Can't Get Her Off My Mind)" (Sam M. Lewis, Flip Phillips, Joe Young) – 2:00
"Long About Now" (Fred Hellerman, Fran Minkoff) – 2:44
"Young and Foolish" (Albert Hague, Arnold B. Horwitt) – 3:22
"Tricks" (Alan Brandt, Bob Haymes) – 1:48

Recorded March 16, 1962 (#5), October 19, 1962 (#2–4, 6–9), December 19, 1962 (#1, 10–11), April 22, 1963 (#12, 17), April 24, 1963 (#14–15), April 26, 1963 (#13, 16, 18)

Personnel
Tony Bennett – vocals
Ralph Sharon – piano
Ralph Burns – arranger
Marty Manning – arranger, conductor
Carlos Lyra - guitar (#11)

References

1963 albums
Tony Bennett albums
Columbia Records albums
Albums arranged by Ralph Burns